Jeremiah Simbiken (born 17 August 2000) is a Papua New Guinean professional rugby league footballer who plays as a  for the Dolphins in the National Rugby League and Papua New Guinea at international level.

Background
Simbiken was born in Eastern Highlands Province, Papua New Guinea.

Playing career

Club career

2022
Simbiken debuted in the 2022 Queensland Cup for the Redcliffe Dolphins scoring 13 tries in 16 matches. 

On 25 August, Simbiken signed a three-year NRL deal with the Dolphins, which will see him hold development contract status with the new NRL team in 2023.

International career
In 2022 Simbiken was named in the Papua New Guinea squad for the 2021 Rugby League World Cup.

In October 2022 he made his international début for Papua New Guinea against Wales.

References

External links
Dolphins profile
Papua New Guinea profile

2000 births
Living people
Papua New Guinea national rugby league team players
Papua New Guinean rugby league players
Rugby league forwards